William Murray (died 1998) was a drummer and photographer from Glasgow, Scotland.

Career 

As a drummer in the early 1970s Murray played with acts including Richard and Linda Thompson's 'Sour Grapes' band and Irish progressive folk band Mellow Candle.  In the 1970s Murray acted as drummer on Kevin Ayers's album Whatevershebringswesing and he later worked with Paul Kossoff.

As a musician Murray also worked with the British multi-instrumentalist, Mike Oldfield, who bought Murray a camera.  Murray worked with Oldfield on albums such as Ommadawn, writing the lyrics for "On Horseback".  Murray became a fashion photographer and moved to Dallas, Texas, United States.  In America Murray also formed a band called The Same with Clodagh Simonds, Carter Burwell, Stephen Bray and Chip Johanessen.

Murray took the photograph of Mike Oldfield that appears on the cover of his 1990 album, Amarok and wrote a short story for the booklet.

Murray died in 1998 in Dublin, Ireland.

References 

Year of birth missing
1998 deaths
Scottish drummers
British male drummers
Scottish photographers
Mellow Candle members